Ronald Eric Parkes (30 September 1926 – 20 July 2004) was an Australian rules footballer who played with North Melbourne in the Victorian Football League (VFL).

Notes

External links 

1926 births
2004 deaths
Australian rules footballers from Melbourne
North Melbourne Football Club players
Yarraville Football Club players
People from Yarraville, Victoria